Forest Township is a township in Becker County, Minnesota, United States. The population was 58 as of the 2000 census.

Geography
Bad Medicine Lake and Big Basswood Lake are the two largest lakes in the township.

Major highway
  Minnesota State Highway 113

Lakes
 Bad Medicine Lake
 Bass Lake
 Big Basswood Lake
 Equay Lake
 Gardner Lake
 Kneebone Lake
 Little Basswood Lake
 Mallard Lake
 Missouri Lake
 Sockeye Lake

Adjacent townships
 Long Lost Lake Township, Clearwater County (north)
 Savannah Township (east)
 Two Inlets Township (southeast)
 Pine Point Township (south)
 Round Lake Township (west)
 La Prairie Township, Clearwater County (northwest)

Demographics
As of the census of 2000, there were 58 people, 32 households, and 23 families residing in the township. The population density was 1.8 people per square mile (0.7/km2). There were 144 housing units at an average density of 4.4/sq mi (1.7/km2). The racial makeup of the township was 100.00% White.

There were 32 households, out of which 3.1% had children under the age of 18 living with them, 71.9% were married couples living together, and 28.1% were non-families. 25.0% of all households were made up of individuals, and 12.5% had someone living alone who was 65 years of age or older. The average household size was 1.81 and the average family size was 2.09.

In the township the population was spread out, with 3.4% under the age of 18, 3.4% from 18 to 24, 5.2% from 25 to 44, 29.3% from 45 to 64, and 58.6% who were 65 years of age or older. The median age was 67 years. For every 100 females, there were 107.1 males. For every 100 females age 18 and over, there were 107.4 males.

The median income for a household in the township was $49,167, and the median income for a family was $36,667. Males had a median income of $81,007 versus $11,250 for females. The per capita income for the township was $30,232. There were 8.3% of families and 6.5% of the population living below the poverty line, including no under eighteens and none of those over 64.

References
 United States National Atlas
 United States Census Bureau 2007 TIGER/Line Shapefiles
 United States Board on Geographic Names (GNIS)

Townships in Becker County, Minnesota
Townships in Minnesota